Fudbalski klub Podgorica, formerly known as OFK Mladost 1970, is a football club from the southwestern part of Podgorica, Montenegro. It was founded in 1970, the club was reactivated during 2014. In the summer 2019, the club was renamed to FK Podgorica.

History

Period 1970-1980 
Founded in 1970 as OFK Mladost, they were one of the numerous clubs from Podgorica which participated in the lowest competitive level in Montenegro at that time. The club played in the Fourth League - Central region. OFK Mladost represented players from Podgorica region Lješkopolje (suburbs Donja Gorica, Gonja Gorica, Donji Kokoti, Farmaci, Grbavci, Beri etc.). At that time, there was another one club from Lješkopolje region - Napredak from Donji Kokoti.
The first big success OFK Mladost made during the 1972–73 season was winning the title in the Fourth league. That gained them promotion to the Montenegrin Republic League, a third-tier competition in SFR Yugoslavia football system.
OFK Mladost played two seasons in the Republic competition. During the 1973–74 season, OFK Mladost finished in 11th place among 16 clubs. Next season, they finished in last place. OFK Mladost were relegated to the Fourth league.
At the end of the seventies, the club was dissolved.
The club's score in the Montenegrin Republic League seasons:

Period 2014- 
In 2014, FK Podgorica was reactivated under the name OFK Mladost 1970. The club started with players' selection and trainings. During 2015, the club's management made the decision to apply for the 2015-16 Third League season. They played their first official matches in the Central Region Cup and soon after that they started playing in the Third League. After two wins, Podgorica went to the final of the Central Region Cup 2015, which meant qualifying for the 2015-16 Montenegrin Cup. In the first leg of the national Cup, Podgorica won against FK Sloga Bar away (1:0), but in the round of 16, First league member FK Lovćen eliminated them (3:0, 2:3). Podgorica finished their inaugural season in the Third League (2015-16) fifth in the table.
Next year (2016), Podgorica won the Central Region Cup, defeating FK Gorštak in the final. That gained them participation in the 2016–17 Montenegrin Cup. In the first round, Podgorica surprisingly eliminated Second League side FK Cetinje, but in the Round of 16 were eliminated by top-flight member FK Iskra.
In the 2016–17 season, Podgorica won the title in the Third League, with 19 wins and one draw in 20 matches. Furthermore, their 14–0 victory against Crvena Stijena is the biggest in the history of Third League - Center. With that result, the team gained significant success - promotion to the 2017-18 Montenegrin Second League.
On their debut in the Second league, Podgorica had an impressive season. The team finished in second place, with seven points less than title winners FK Mornar. Besides, their attacker Elie Matuoke was the top scorer of Second League, with 23 goals. With that success, Podgorica participated in the Montenegrin First League playoffs, but could not achieve promotion. Their opponent was OFK Petrovac, who won the first game at DG Arena (3-0), while the second game finished with a draw (2-2).
In the 2018–19 season, Podgorica won the title. It was their first ever promotion to the top-flight, which was secured four weeks before the end of the season. Except that, Podgorica made another success in the Montenegrin Cup. After eliminating Otrant (1-0) and Kom (1-0, 3–0), they reached the quarterfinals and their rival was a well-known national side Budućnost. In the first game at Podgorica City Stadium, Podgorica made a big sensation (1-1), but they were eliminated in the second leg after losing 0–1.
Under the new name, Podgorica debuted in the top-flight in the 2019–20 season. They played their first game in Prva CFL against Petrovac away and drew 1-1. At the same time, they made a new club - OFK Mladost DG - as an affiliate partner, which aims to produce young talents for the FK Podgorica first team. On their debut in the top-tier, Podgorica battled for European competition - both in the League and in the Cup, where they progressed to semifinals. But due to the COVID-19 pandemic, Montenegrin First League 2019-20 was interrupted after the 31st week and fifth-placed Podgorica failed to qualify for the UEFA Europe League.
Next season, Podgorica begun with seven consecutive games without single defeat, and among them was victory against title-holder Budućnost (4-0). So, after the first quarter of season, Podgorica was the leader on the table. After that, Podgorica's form worsened, but they remained in the top-four in Prva CFL. With that result, team from DG Arena qualified for their first-ever appearance in European competitions - 2021–22 UEFA Europa Conference League.

Season to season
The club's score after reactivation:

Honours
 Montenegrin Second League – 1
winners (1): 2018–19
runners-up (1): 2017–18
 Montenegrin Third League – 1
winners (1): 2016–17
 Montenegrin Fourth League – 1
winners (1): 1972–73
Central Region Cup – 1
winners (1): 2016–17
runners-up (1): 2015–16

European record

As of match played 15 July 2021

Notes
 QR: Qualifying round

Players

Current squad

Notable players
For the list of former and current players with Wikipedia article, please see :Category:FK Podgorica players.

Stadium 

In the 1970s, the club played in their own field at Donja Gorica, near the local pond. In their first season after the reactivation, FK Podgorica played their home matches in the neighbouring Donji Kokoti.

On 21 May 2016, a new stadium of FK Podgorica in Donja Gorica was opened. Two years after that, DG Arena was built. With 4,000 seats, facilities as additional ground and other, it meets the criteria for First League and UEFA matches. The name of the stadium is an acronym - DG are the initials of the Donja Gorica suburb.

See also 
 OFK Mladost Donja Gorica
 Montenegrin Second League
 Football in Montenegro
 Montenegrin clubs in Yugoslav football competitions (1946–2006)

References

External links
 

Association football clubs established in 1970
Football clubs in Podgorica
1970 establishments in Montenegro